Fu Shan is a small hill in Hong Kong. It is notable for a trail on its ridge that allows one to view the threatened species Chinese White Dolphins jumping from the water into the air.

Access 
Fu Shan is only accessible by foot. It can be approached in a few different ways.  One way of reaching the summit is to make a sharp right after going past Tai O Heritage Hotel at the western end of Shek Tsai Po Street and follow the signage along the way.

See also 

 List of mountains, peaks and hills in Hong Kong
 Lantau Peak

References